Lorglumide (CR-1409) is a drug which inhibits gastrointestinal motility and reduces gastric secretions, acting as a cholecystokinin antagonist, with fairly high selectivity for the CCKA subtype. It has been suggested as a potential treatment for a variety of gastrointestinal problems including stomach ulcers, irritable bowel syndrome, dyspepsia, constipation and pancreatitis, as well as some forms of cancer, but animal and human testing has produced inconsistent results and no clear therapeutic role has been established, although it is widely used in scientific research.

References 

Cholecystokinin antagonists
Chloroarenes
Benzamides